The 2015 WBSC Premier12 was an international baseball championship sponsored by the World Baseball Softball Confederation (WBSC), the inaugural event of the WBSC Premier12. It was held from November 8 to 21 in Taiwan and Japan. The South Korean national team won the championship, and split a US$1 million prize.

The top twelve teams in the WBSC World Rankings qualified to participate in the tournament, which began with two groups of six teams playing in a round-robin format for the first round. The tournament then continued with the top four teams in each group playing in the knockout stage, leading to the championship game. In the final, South Korea defeated United States 8–0 to win their first WBSC Premier12 title, and became the first nation to win the championship. Japan finished in third place, while Mexico finished in fourth place. South Korea's Hyun-soo Kim won the Most Valuable Player Award. Shohei Ohtani of Japan had the lowest earned run average of the tournament, and Hayato Sakamoto, also of Japan, was named the tournament's most outstanding defensive player. The next edition 2019 WBSC Premier12 will be hosted in Japan

Teams

The twelve highest-ranked national teams (as of the 2014 end-of-the-year world rankings)  qualified to participate in the inaugural 2015 WBSC Premier 12, based on the most recent WBSC World Rankings, which were updated on November 22, 2014. The membership in the top twelve in the world rankings, which are updated only once every year, was unchanged from 2013. In fact, there was no movement at all between the 7th and 15th positions in the rankings.

Players

The majority of teams in the tournament missed the October 10 deadline for submitting rosters. Major League Baseball (MLB), which sponsors the World Baseball Classic, declined to allow players on MLB 40-man rosters to participate in the tournament. The final rosters included a mix of MLB prospects (such as Milwaukee Brewers outfielder Brett Phillips and Chicago White Sox outfielder Jacob May for the United States), former MLB veterans (such as Curaçaoan infielder Andruw Jones and Dominican infielder Pedro Feliz) and non-MLB stars (including Japanese pitchers Shohei Ohtani and South Korean infielder Park Byung-ho).

Format
For the first stage, the twelve teams were divided into two groups of six. Each team played five games in a round robin format. With the exception of the first game of the tournament, a contest between Japan and South Korea at the Sapporo Dome, Taiwan hosted all games in the group stage at four different ballparks.

The top four teams from each group then advanced to a single-elimination tournament. The semifinal and final round were held in Japan while the location of the quarterfinal, the first round of the playoff stage, was initially undetermined. Thirty-eight games were played over fourteen days, culminating in the consolation game and championship game at the Tokyo Dome on the final day of the tournament.

Broadcast
Fox Sports was awarded broadcast rights in Cyprus, Greece, Israel, Italy, Malta, Netherlands and Turkey. Dutch public broadcast network NOS will also air the tournament in the Netherlands. Rights were also awarded to Eleven Sports Network in Belgium, Poland, Singapore and Malaysia; beIN Sports in Indonesia, Singapore and Oceania; LeTV and PPTV in China; Sky Net in Myanmar; Solar TV in the Philippines; i-CABLE in Hong Kong; OSN in the Middle East and North Africa; SBS in South Korea; Videoland in Taiwan; CIRT in Cuba; and Sportsnet in Canada. In Japan, Tokyo Broadcasting System Television, TV Asahi and J Sports will all be carrying the tournament.

For areas not covered by the event's broadcast partners, the event will be livestreamed for free on the WBSC's YouTube channel.

Venues

Group stage

Group A

|}

Group B

|}

Playoff stage

Quarterfinals

|}
Though Canada led Group A with a 5–0 record, they were upset in the quarterfinals by Mexico. Zack Segovia led the United States to a victory over the Netherlands. South Korea defeated Cuba, taking a 5–0 lead over Cuba by the second inning. Japan defeated Puerto Rico behind the pitching of Kenta Maeda.

Semifinals

|}
South Korea had lost to Japan in round-robin play. Japan led their semifinal matchup 3–0 going into the ninth inning, but South Korea scored four runs in the final inning to defeat Japan. Meanwhile, the United States defeated Mexico 6–1, scoring four runs in the fifth inning, to advance to the championship round.

Third place game

|}
In the third place game, Japan defeated Mexico 11–1, with the game ending after seven innings due to the mercy rule. Japan's Tetsuto Yamada hit two home runs, and Sho Nakata and Nobuhiro Matsuda each hit a home run, and the score was 8–0 after two innings.

Championship

In the championship game, Lee Yong-kyu of South Korea recorded a run batted in (RBI) double in the first inning off of Zack Segovia. Kim Hyun-soo had an RBI double in the third inning, and scored two more runs on a double in the fourth inning. Park Byung-ho hit a home run off of Brooks Pounders to left field in the fourth inning. Kim finished the game three hits, including two doubles that scored runs. Kim Hyun-soo and Jeong Keun-woo also had three hits apiece, and Jeong recorded a run batted in with a bases loaded walk in the ninth inning.

The United States had defeated South Korea during their sole matchup during group play by a score of 3–2 in extra innings. Kim later explained that the South Korean team made adjustments to better prepare for the fastballs thrown by United States pitchers. Before the game, United States players Brett Eibner, J. B. Wendelken, and Jake Barrett became ineligible to play in the championship game as they had been added to the 40-man rosters of their respective Major League Baseball organizations.

Final standings

Awards
Following 38 global games, the WBSC announced the first-ever Premier12 All-World Team. WBSC also announced the individual awards winners.

Prize money
The WBSC announced that it would be giving away $3,800,000 in prize money to participants, distributed as follows:

Winner: US$1,000,000
2nd Place: US$600,000
3rd place: US$400,000
4th place: US$300,000
5–8th place: US$225,000 each
9–12th place: US$150,000 each

Controversies
Despite South Korea's victory in the entire tournament, many South Korean fans and officials were angered and complaining of how the 2015 WBSC Premier League was heavily biased in favor of the co-host nation Japan's team, and that they purposefully set up in advance of Korea's team under disadvantage by restraining them from practicing and giving them rather complicated schedules and obstacles (that including of a stadium fire) that other countries did not needed to go through or have. The Korea Baseball Organization (KBO) was also under fire for not doing enough to solve the issues of Japan's favorable play in the tournament. Jeong Keum Jo, KBO's representative official, stated that the KBO has numerously filed a complaint to Japan of the corrupt play, but was only advised to understand that the premier league had to be successful, and so was dismissed.

Additional claims are that Japan purposefully pulled the semifinal match schedule to Thursday as a last-minute change when it was announced that South Korea was going to be Japan's opponent; sponsorship and money is said to be the reason of the schedule change. This meant that Korean players were to wake up at 3:30 am to take the flight from Taiwan to Japan, while Japanese players were able to rest and practice more during that time. Korea claims this was to purposefully tire the Korean team ahead of the game. On top of that, further criticism came in when Japan had organized Koda Kawaguchi, a Japanese umpire for the game that of between South Korea and Japan, as it was considered to be a further sign of pro-Japan bias during the tournament. When the game ended with an unexpected South Korean victory, Japan's television networks moved the tournament broadcasting time from 7 PM to 3:45 AM, causing stir in South Korea once more pointing out of how it was unnecessary to do such, and that it was to show fewer people of the highlights.

See also
 List of sporting events in Taiwan

References

External links

WBSC Premier12
WBSC Premier12
WBSC Premier12
2010s in Taipei
21st century in Sapporo
Bunkyō
International baseball competitions hosted by Japan
International baseball competitions hosted by Taiwan
WBSC Premier12
Sport in Taichung
Sport in Taoyuan City
Sports competitions in Sapporo
Sports competitions in Taipei
Sports competitions in Tokyo
Toyohira-ku, Sapporo
WBSC Premier12
Yunlin County